William Paulet, 4th Marquess of Winchester  (bef. 1560 – 4 February 1629) was an English nobleman, the son of William Paulet, 3rd Marquess of Winchester and Anne or Agnes Howard. He was styled Lord St. John from 1576 to 1598. He was summoned to Parliament on 16 January 1581 in his father's barony as Lord St. John. On 24 November 1598, he succeeded his father as 4th Marquess of Winchester. Paulet experienced great financial difficulties arising from his magnificent style of living and his lavish entertainment of Elizabeth I at Basing House.

Marriage and issue
On 28 February 1587 at St Martin-in-the-Fields, he married Lady Lucy Cecil, daughter of Sir Thomas Cecil, 1st Earl of Exeter and his first wife, Dorothy Neville. Lucy and William had six children:

William Paulet, Lord St John (1587/8–1621), married Mary Browne, daughter of Anthony-Maria Browne, 2nd Viscount Montagu
 Thomas Paulet, died before 1621
John Paulet, 5th Marquess of Winchester (c.1598–5 March 1675) married three times:
Jane Savage, daughter of Thomas Savage, 1st Viscount Savage
Honora de Burgh, daughter of Richard Burke, 4th Earl of Clanricarde
Isabel Howard, daughter of William Howard, 1st Viscount Stafford and Mary Stafford
 Lord Henry Paulet, of Amport, married Lucy Philpot, daughter of Sir George Philpot of Thruxton
 Charles Paulet, died c.1654, had issue
 Edward Paulet

His wife, Lucy, was treated for cancer in 1614 by the court physician Théodore de Mayerne. She died 1 October 1614 and was buried a month later in the Cecil vault in Westminster Abbey.

Death
William Paulet died at Hackwood, near Basingstoke, on 4 February 1629, and was buried at Basing, Hampshire.

Footnotes

Sources

External links 
 William Paulet, Marquess of Winchester Family tree
  History of Basing House

|-

1629 deaths
Year of birth uncertain
William
People from Old Basing
4
Burials at St. Mary's Church, Old Basing